President Bush may refer to:

 George H. W. Bush (1924–2018), President of the United States from 1989 to 1993 and father of George W. Bush
 George W. Bush (born 1946), President of the United States from 2001 to 2009 and son of George H. W. Bush

See also
 Presidency of George Bush (disambiguation)
 George Bush (disambiguation)
 Bush (disambiguation)